The 1999–2000 FA Trophy was the thirty-first season of the FA Trophy.

1st round

Ties

Replays

2nd round
The teams that given byes to this round are Kingstonian, Scarborough, Kettering Town, Hayes, Rushden & Diamonds, Yeovil Town, Stevenage Borough, Northwich Victoria, Woking, Hednesford Town, Dover Athletic, Forest Green Rovers, Hereford United, Morecambe, Kidderminster Harriers, Doncaster Rovers, Telford United, Southport, Welling United, Nuneaton Borough, Altrincham, Sutton United, Farnborough Town, Tamworth, Bromley, Dulwich Hamlet, Aldershot Town, Worksop Town, Ashford Town (Kent), Droylsden, Uxbridge, Witton Albion, Dartford, Whitley Bay, Bedworth United, Barton Rovers, Evesham United, Harrogate Town, Worcester City, Bamber Bridge, Enfield, Gainsborough Trinity, Whitby Town, Crawley Town, Hyde United, Stalybridge Celtic, Weymouth, Winsford United, Billericay Town, Marine, Walton & Hersham, Lancaster City, Carshalton Athletic, Bishop Auckland, Canvey Island, Wealdstone, Folkestone Invicta, Newport I O W, Eastwood Town, Grays Athletic, Radcliffe Borough, Stafford Rangers, Bilston Town, Blakenall, Stocksbridge Park Steels, Sutton Coldfield Town, Gretna, Leyton Pennant, Witney Town, Wisbech Town, Erith & Belvedere, St Leonards, Whyteleafe, Stamford, Staines Town, V S Rugby, Yate Town, Workington and Bedford Town.

Ties

Replays

3rd round

Ties

Replays

4th round

Ties

Replays

5th round

Ties

Quarter finals

Ties

Replays

Semi finals

First leg

Second leg

Final

Tie

References

General
 Football Club History Database: FA Trophy 1999–2000

Specific

1999–2000 domestic association football cups
League
1999–2000